This is a list of VTV dramas released in the period of 1982-1993. 

1982-1993 - 1994→

Films
During the period from 1982 to 1993, new Vietnamese television films were released sporadically on VTV1. Besides, there were still several certain time slots to playback Vietnamese feature films.

Note: Since 1985, Vietnam Audio Visual Company (Vietnamese: Công ty nghe nhìn Việt Nam), which was established in 1980, had been converted to Vietnam Television Audio Visual Center (Vietnamese: Trung tâm nghe nhìn - Đài truyền hình Việt Nam).

See also
 List of dramas broadcast by Vietnam Television (VTV)
 List of dramas broadcast by Hanoi Radio Television (HanoiTV)
 List of dramas broadcast by Vietnam Digital Television (VTC)

References

External links
VTV.gov.vn – Official VTV Website 
VTV.vn – Official VTV Online Newspaper 

Vietnam Television original programming